The Honda CB900F is a Honda motorcycle made in two iterations which appeared some twenty years apart. Both generations of the CB900F are straight four-cylinder four-stroke  roadsters. 

The first generation was produced from 1979 through 1983, and was available in the United States in 1981 and 1982. In 1983 it was replaced by the CB1100F.  The second generation was available from 2002 through 2007. It is called the Hornet 900 in Europe and the 919 in North America, while the related CB600F is the Hornet 600 in Europe and the 599 in North America. In 2008 the second generation CB900 was replaced by the CB1000R.

First generation

Background
In 1969 Honda introduced its flagship CB750 superbike, whose success led to Honda's domination of the motorcycle market.  Honda had been successful in European endurance racing with their RCB-series RS1000, and had made advances in suspension technology from their experience in motocross, and the company chose to base a new DOHC roadster on their endurance racer.

The CB900F's design was aimed at European markets, rather than the usual focus on the United States, where it was not available until 1981. In Europe, it was initially named Super Sport like the 750 (FZ and FA) later named after the Bol d'Or endurance race. In the market, the CB900F competed with larger capacity bikes like the Kawasaki Kz1000, Suzuki GS1000, and Yamaha XS1100.

Design
The engine drew on other designs, such as the CB1000C,  CB1100F/CB1100R, and the inline-6 CBX1000. The CB900F has a five-speed gearbox and chain final drive, and it produces  at 9,000 rpm The CB900F has two front disc brakes and one rear disk brake, all fitted with dual-piston calipers after 1983. The air-assisted fork was fitted with the Honda TRAC (torque reactive anti-dive control) anti-dive system in 1982 or 1983. The bike shares the same bodywork (tank, side covers, tailpiece) as the earlier CB750F Super Sport. There are similarities between the CB900F bodywork and that of the CB1100F and CBX.

Performance
In magazine tests, the CB900F typically clocked low to mid 12 seconds in the quarter mile (and a low 11.84 seconds in a Motorcyclist magazine test).  The engine was tuned to produce mid range power rather than maximizing peak horsepower, thus giving good acceleration from 4,000 rpm to the 9,500 rpm redline.  At  there was some vibration, but the relaxed riding position was comfortable at most speeds, but at the  maximum speed wind pressure could cause rider discomfort. The CB900F was succeeded in 1983 by the CB1100F, and in 1987 Honda introduced the CBR1000F water-cooled inline fours.

Reception
Honda's advertising proclaimed the bike to be "a thundering Super-Sports bike with devastating performance and an unwavering stamina". The bike's conventional twin down-tube steel frame is very strong.  This, along with improved suspension made the CB900F "arguably the best Honda had built for the street," and capable of challenging European motorcycles in performance and roadholding. For its time, the CB900F was called, "the ultimate statement of the old air-cooled technology Honda had done so much to create". In anticipation of the 2002 model, one reporter reminisced that the original "was a powerful machine, if a bit heavy.  All gas tank and engine, stable on the highway, middle-of-the-road good looks and hound-dog reliable." Rod Ker, however, writes that it had "two bad habits," that "it dropped out of gear, and — sometimes as a direct result — broke con-rods. This was a great pity, because it was a good bike until it broke, blessed with a frame and suspension that showed the Japanese were catching up with the Europeans in chassis technology."

Second generation

The second generation Honda CB900F is a standard motorcycle based on a sport bike engine but with a more upright seating position and revised engine and gearing, providing performance and comfort between a typical sport bike and a cruiser. It was called the Hornet in Europe and the 919 in North America because the trademark for the vehicle name Hornet in North America was held by Chrysler, acquired after buying AMC, maker of the AMC Hornet car.

In some ways the concept dates to a 1994 design study created by American Honda's R&D chief product evaluator Dirk Vandenberg in cooperation with Cycle World magazine, a streetfighter-like one-off custom based on the Honda CBR900RR, with the fairings removed, high, tubular handlebar, and tuning and gearing modified to boost low-end torque. Vandenberg saw a market in the "older sportbike crowd" who are seeking high performance without an awkward riding position or racetrack style bodywork.

It was introduced in 2002 and its last model year was 2007, after which it was replaced by the CB1000R. After compliance with tightening emissions regulations became untenable, it was replaced by the more performance-specialized CB1000R. In 2006, Motorcyclist recommended used 919s as a good buy, saying of the new bike, "at $7999, it wasn't exactly cheap, and saddled with a coat of flat-black paint called Asphalt, it was less than visually electrifying," however, in the used market it became a great value. In the US market, the 919, like the 599, was expensive, because, being intended for the European market, they were made in Italy, and so had to be imported to the US against unfavorable Euro exchange rates.

The Daily Telegraph welcomed the new bike, saying, "the new CB900F Hornet leaves your knees in the breeze and your smile full of bugs as it reintroduces you to a feeling of undemanding, rewarding two-wheeled fun that has been missing from the market for a long time." Comparing it to the Hornet 600, the bike was reminiscent of the standards of the 1970s, sometimes called Universal Japanese Motorcycles.

Design
The CB900F is powered by a de-tuned Honda CBR900RR engine, developed by Tadao Baba, one of Honda's Large Project Leaders. The engine has cast camshafts and pistons instead of the more expensive forged versions found on the CBR929 and later. For greater midrange torque, the CB900F's camshaft lift is lower, and compression is slightly lowered. Four  fuel-injection throttle bodies take the place of the CBR900RR's  carburetors. Redline is 9500 rpm. The bike has a cable-actuated clutch, a six-speed transmission, and a chain final drive.

A steel, square-tube backbone frame supports the stressed member engine. In front, a cartridge fork (adjustable beginning in 2004) guides the wheel, while a single Showa shock, adjustable only for preload (and rebound damping beginning in 2004) connects with the aluminum swingarm and carries the weight in back. Its brakes are dual-disc in the front and single-disc in the rear.

Instrumentation consists of an analog speedometer and tachometer and basic indicator lamps, incorporated under a tinted window, and a single tripmeter. While it normally was equipped with a centerstand, California models did not have room for one due to additional emissions control equipment.

The chain drive is a 530 chain with stock gearing of 16 tooth front and 43 tooth rear sprockets.

A  carburetted version exists in the form of the CB600F, known as the Hornet 600 in Europe and the 599 in North America.

Performance
Having the lowest weight in its class and a good power-to-weight ratio, it stands well in comparison to bikes with greater output like the Yamaha FZ1, and the wide, high handlebars ease quick turning and make cornering enjoyable. The suspension of the early versions was criticized, but after the upgrade to an adjustable fork, the complaints died down. Cycle World saw the 919 as a practical solution to the real-world problem of imperfect roads and traffic, rather than a mere compromise between a sportbike and a commuter or touring ride.

See also
 Honda CB900C
 Honda Hornet (disambiguation)

Notes

References

External links

Honda 919 - official press and photo releases
CB900F(919) Specifications, Honda Australia

CB900F
Standard motorcycles
Motorcycles introduced in 1979
Motorcycles introduced in 2002